De or Dey is a surname commonly used by the Bengali community. De/Dey is derived from the last name Deb/Dev or Deva. The surname has been associated mainly with Bengali Kayasthas, but is also found among Suvarna Banik, Teli and some other communities.

In 12th–13th century, a Hindu dynasty Deva ruled over eastern Bengal after the Sena dynasty. The capital of this dynasty was Bikrampur in present-day Munshiganj district of Bangladesh. This Hindu Vaishnava dynasty is different from an earlier Buddhist Deva dynasty (c. 8th–9th century) of Samatata, whose capital was Devaparvata. Four rulers of this dynasty are known from the inscriptions: Shantideva, Viradeva, Anandadeva and Bhavadeva.

Notable people with the surname

Academics
 Barun De (1932–2013), historian
 Bishnu Dey (1909–1982), poet
 Chandra Kumar De (1889–1946), Indian folklorist
 Harinath De (1877–1911), linguist
 Kanny Lall Dey (1831–1899), chemist
 Sambhu Nath De, (1915–1985), scientist
 Shobhaa De (1948), writer

Artists
 Manishi Dey (1906–1989), artist
 Mukul Dey (1895–1989), artist
 Rani Chanda (née Dey) (1912–1997), artist

Bar and the Bench
 Niren De, lawyer

Businessmen
 Ramdulal Dey (Sarkar) (1752–1825)

Civil Servants
 Brajendranath De (1852–1932), ICS officer

Films
 Deepankar De (1944), actor
 Gita Dey (1931–2011), actress
 Sreejita De (1989), actress
Susan Dey (1952), actress

Journalists
 Lal Behari Dey (Mondal) (1824–1892), Indian journalist and author

Music
 K.C. Dey, (1893–1962), Singer
 Manna Dey (1919–2013), Indian singer
 Mohini Dey (1996), Bengali Indian bass player, singer and song writer

Social Reformers
  Saroj Nalini Dutt (née Dey), M.B.E., (1887–1925), social worker

Spiritual Leaders
 A. C. Bhaktivedanta Swami Prabhupada, born Abhay Charan De (1896–1977), spiritual teacher and founder of ISKCON

Sports
 Krishanu Dey (1962–2003), Indian football player

See also 
 Dey (disambiguation)

References 

Marathi-language surnames
Indian surnames
Bengali Hindu surnames